The Koninklijk Atheneum Vijverhof (Koninklijk Atheneum II, its administration name) (Royal Athenaeum Vijverhof in English) is a secondary school situated in Sint-Michiels, a suburb of Bruges, Belgium. It is part of the school group "Brugge-Oostkust" (Bruges-Eastcoast in English). The school offers education in the ASO (General Secondary Education) division. There is a free choice of religion at the school.

Germz

School year
 Every school year starts the first of September and ends June 30. There is no school on public holidays.
 The average school day begins at 8:20am and ends at 4:30pm. Students get an hour break for lunch and a short recess every 2 periods (1 period = 50minutes). On Wednesday the school day starts at 8:20am and ends at 11:55am with a recess between the 2nd and 3rd period.
 The school year consists of three trimesters with an exam for each subject at the end of each semester. They also receive a grade on quality of their work over the entire trimester. (homework, tests, projects etc.) This makes for 5 grades for each subject at the end of the year.  
 The students get a report card each trimester containing:
 The evaluations of their performance for each subject.
 The results of the exams for each subject.

Classes

There are 6 classes for the ASO division.(see picture on the right)
The 6 classes are divided into 3 cycles:
 First cycle (year 1 and 2) 
 Second cycle (year 3 and 4) 
 Third cycle (year 5 and 6)

GWP
 GWP stands for geïntegreerde werkperiode or Integrated Work Period. This is a period during the year where each grade travels with school to different locations across Europe for a more integrated lesson.
For example: in 2007:
  Blankenberge at the Belgian coast, for the 1st grade
  Ardennes in the south of Belgium, for the 2nd grade
  Kent in England, for the 3rd grade
  Normandy in northern France, for the 4th grade
  Camargue in southern France, for the 5th and 6th grade

And in 2008:
  Kent in England, for the 3rd grade
  Normandy in northern France, for the 4th grade
  Ardennes in the south of Belgium, for the 5th grade
  Paris The capital of France, for the 6th grade

Natural Environment

The school has a pond on its campus which is a recognised reservation by the WWF. The pond is used for educational purposes and he provides a habitat for a variety of species. The maintenance is done by the students as seen on the picture.

See also
 Community Education
 Education in Belgium

External links
 http://www.kavijverhof.be
 http://www.scholengroep25.be

References

Schools in Belgium
Education in Bruges
Buildings and structures in Bruges
Educational institutions established in 1973
1973 establishments in Belgium